Hengelo is a railway station in Hengelo, Netherlands. The station was opened on 18 October 1865 and is on the Almelo–Salzbergen railway and the Zutphen–Glanerbeek railway. It underwent a major renovation in 2010.

Train services 
,the following train services call at this station:
7 daily Intercity services Amsterdam – Amersfoort – Hengelo – Osnabrück – Hannover – Berlin
1× per hour express Intercity service: Schiphol – Amersfoort – Hengelo – Enschede
1× per hour express Intercity service: The Hague – Utrecht – Amersfoort – Hengelo – Enschede
2× per hour local Sprinter service: Apeldoorn – Deventer – Almelo – Hengelo – Enschede
3x per hour local Sprinter service: Zwolle – Almelo – Hengelo – Enschede
2× per hour local Stoptrein service: Zutphen – Hengelo – Oldenzaal

Facilities 

Hengelo has some facilities which are located underneath the platforms, such as an Albert Heijn to Go, Kiosk and an AKO.

Platforms 

Hengelo has three platforms, 2, 3, and 11. Platform 11 is located at the end of the station, between platform 2 and 3, and is used for regional trains to Bad Bentheim and Bielefeld.

Bus services 

8 Enschede – Twente University – Hengelo Station – Hengelo, Westermaat – Hengelo, Hasselo
9 Enschede – Twente University – Hengelo
10 Hengelo – Veldwijk
11 Station – Hasselo
12 Station – Tuindorp Het Lansink – Hospital – Nijverheld – Weidedorp – Station
13 Station – Hengelose Es – Vossenbelt – Hasselo
14 Hengelo – Deurningen – Weerselo – Fleringen – Tubbergen
15 Hengelo – Twente University
16 Hengelo – Twente University
51 Almelo – Zenderen – Borne – Hengelo
53 Hengelo – Beckum – Haaksbergen
59 Hengelo – Beckum – Haaksbergen

External links 

NS website 
Dutch Public Transport journey planner 

Railway stations in Overijssel
Railway stations opened in 1865
Railway stations on the Almelo–Salzbergen railway line
Railway stations on the Staatslijn D
Hengelo